The Financial Modeling World Cup (FMWC) is a financial modeling competition. The competition was started in September 2020. Contestants solve real-life financial problems, in the form of case studies, by building financial models in Microsoft Excel spreadsheet software. Stages held through the year contribute to a global leaderboard. The event is sponsored by financial services firm AG Capital and Microsoft.

Background and description 
Similar financial modeling competitions have been run in the past, including the also-Microsoft-sponsored ModelOff Financial Modeling World Championships from 2012 to 2019. After live online rounds, the competition culminated in a finals event and conference in New York City or London. The program was retired in 2020; competitions such as FMWC have taken its place in the market. The first Financial Modeling World Cup started in September 2020, continuing throughout 2020, 2021 and 2022.

Financial Modeling World Cup is a series of financial modeling competitions that are being held on a regular basis. In each stage of the competition, competitors solve three problems presented as one-to-five-page-long financial modeling case studies with questions at the end, using Microsoft Excel. The total number of points available for correctly solving all the cases at each stage amounts to 1,000 points per stage. During a calendar year, the overall FMWC Rankings are being calculated and updated, based on the participant performance. Each stage of the competition takes two hours to complete and is run over a two-day-long window. The participants are divided into groups determined by age: U-25 (born in 1997 – onward) and Open (born in 1996 and earlier).

Champions

2020 season 
September 2020 marked the debut of the Financial Modeling World regular monthly stages. Joseph Lau from Australia was the winner of the 2020 season, scoring 5535 points.

2021 season 

In 2021, the Financial Modeling World Cup offered monthly stages of the competition starting in January. Diarmuid Early from the United States was the winner of the 2021 season, scoring 11,925 points.

2022 season 
Financial Modeling World Cup continues its operations in 2022, however, reducing the regular stage count from 12 to 8. Laurence Lau from the United States of America was the winner of the 2022 season, scoring 5937 points.

Excel as esports 
Besides organizing regular stages for competing in financial modeling, Financial Modeling World Cup occasionally broadcasts live "Excel as esports" battles between Excel users. Some of the events are invitational (888 Battle, Battle of 16), some are open for everyone (FMWC Open). All battles are livestreamed and can be spectated.

888 Battle

An FMWC battle was held on June 8, 2021, with eight competitors from eight countries: Andrew Ngai from the United Kingdom, Michael Jarman from Canada, Stéphanie Annerose from the US, Jason Webber from South Africa, Gabriela Strój from Poland, Anup Agarwal from India, John Lim from Australia, and Jeff Heng Siang Tan from Malaysia. Ngai, Agarwal, and Jarman were considered favorites to win the event, with Ngai being ranked second in the world; Jarman had previously co-won ModelOff 2017, while Ngai won ModelOff 2019. Diarmuid Early, ranked first in the world, did not participate. Jarman ended up winning the event, solving 13 questions out of 21 correctly.

Battle of 16

Battle of 16, taking place on September 8–9, 2021, was the second live Excel battle organized by the Financial Modeling World Cup. The event was held on an invitational basis. 16 participants from 13 different countries competed in a head-to-head playoff format. The event was held in three sessions (Quarter-Finals, Semi-Finals and Finals). The winner was Diarmuid Early from the US.

FMWC Open

FMWC Open was an online esports tournament based in Microsoft Excel. The tournament has a Qualification Round followed by Playoff Rounds, starting from the Last 128 Round. The competition was a standalone event that did not impact the Financial Modeling World Cup World Rankings in regular seasons.

After qualifying matches, the 2021 FMWC Open tournament had 128 contestants from around the world. Qualification rounds began on November 13, and continued into December. The last three rounds of the FMWC Open competition were held on December 11, 2021, and were broadcast on FMWC YouTube channel and ESPN3. Ngai (now representing Australia), Agarwal, and Jarman returned as quarterfinals qualifiers, and Harry Gross from the UK, Jason Moore from the US, Joseph Palisoc from the US, Sameer Jagetia from the US, and Tim Roberts from the UK also qualified. The final round, entitled "Knights and Warriors", had contestants, each representing a fictional nation, send fictional warriors to conquer each other. Ngai defeated Jarman 734–280, with a maximum of 1,000 points per side.

References

External links 
 Official website

Microsoft Office
Finance
Esports competitions
2020 establishments